The 2011 Evening Standard Theatre Awards were announced on 20 November 2011. The shortlist was revealed on 7 November 2011 and the longlist on 19 October 2011.

Winners, shortlist and longlist

 = winner

Best Play
  The Heretic by Richard Bean (Royal Court)
  One Man, Two Guvnors by Richard Bean (National's Lyttelton)
 Becky Shaw by Gina Gionfriddo (Almeida)
 Tribes by Nina Raine (Royal Court)

Longlisted
 Wittenberg by David Davalos (Gate)
 The Knot of the Heart by David Eldridge (Almeida)
 Remembrance Day by Aleksey Scherbak (Royal Court)

Best Director
  Mike Leigh for Grief (National's Cottesloe)
 Rob Ashford for Anna Christie (Donmar)
 Dominic Cooke for Chicken Soup with Barley (Royal Court)
 Edward Hall for Richard III & The Comedy of Errors (Propeller at Hampstead)

Longlisted
 Lucy Bailey for The Beggar's Opera (Open Air Theatre) & Kingdom of Earth (Print Room) & Fabrication (Print Room)
 Danny Boyle for Frankenstein (National's Olivier)
 Declan Donnellan for The Tempest (Cheek By Jowl at Barbican)
 Simon Godwin for The Acid Test (Royal Court)
 Michael Grandage for Luise Miller (Donmar)
 Sean Holmes for Saved (Lyric Hammersmith)
 Sam Mendes for Richard III (Old Vic)
 Roger Michell for Tribes (Royal Court)
 Rufus Norris for London Road (National's Cottesloe)
 Trevor Nunn for Flare Path (Theatre Royal Haymarket)
 Bijan Sheibani for The Kitchen (National's Olivier)
 Max Stafford-Clark for Top Girls (Chichester's Minerva & Trafalgar Studios)
 Jessica Swale for The Belle's Stratagem (Southwark Playhouse)
 Matthew Warchus for Matilda the Musical (RSC Stratford & Cambridge Theatre)
 Nicholas Hytner for One Man, Two Guvnors (National Theatre)

Best Actor
  Benedict Cumberbatch, Frankenstein (National's Olivier)
  Jonny Lee Miller, Frankenstein (National's Olivier)
 Bertie Carvel, Matilda the Musical (RSC Stratford & Cambridge Theatre)
 Charles Edwards, Much Ado About Nothing (Shakespeare's Globe)

Longlisted
 Richard Clothier, Richard III (Propeller at Hampstead)
 James Corden, One Man, Two Guvnors (National's Lyttelton)
 Ralph Fiennes, The Tempest (Theatre Royal Haymarket)
 Harry Hadden-Paton, Flare Path (Theatre Royal Haymarket)
 Derek Jacobi, King Lear (Donmar)
 Jude Law, Anna Christie (Donmar)
 Kevin Spacey, Richard III (Old Vic)
 Dominic West, Butley (Duchess)

Natasha Richardson Award for Best Actress
  Sheridan Smith, Flare Path (Theatre Royal Haymarket)
 Samantha Spiro, Chicken Soup with Barley (Royal Court)
 Kristin Scott Thomas, Betrayal (Comedy)

Longlisted
 Gemma Arterton, The Master Builder (Almeida)
 Tracie Bennett, End of the Rainbow (Trafalgar Studios)
 Eve Best, Much Ado About Nothing (Shakespeare's Globe)
 Lisa Dillon, The Knot of the Heart (Almeida)
 Haydn Gwynne, Richard III (Old Vic)
 Lesley Manville, Grief (National's Cottesloe)
 Sinead Matthews, Ecstasy (Hampstead)
 Ruth Negga, The Playboy of the Western World (Old Vic)
 Imelda Staunton, A Delicate Balance (Almeida)
 Michelle Terry, Tribes (Royal Court)
 Tracey Ullman, My City (Almeida)
 Ruth Wilson, Anna Christie (Donmar)

Ned Sherrin Award for Best Musical
  Matilda the Musical, RSC Stratford & Cambridge Theatre
 Betty Blue Eyes, Novello Theatre
 London Road, National's Cottesloe

Longlisted
 Crazy for You, Open Air Theatre
 Fela!, National's Olivier
 Parade, Southwark Playhouse
 Woody Sez, Arts Theatre

Best Design
  Adam Cork, sound designer of Anna Christie & King Lear (Donmar)
 Bunny Christie, Men Should Weep (National's Lyttelton)
 Lizzie Clachan, Wastwater (Royal Court)
 Mark Tildesley, Frankenstein (National's Olivier)

Longlisted
 Paul Barritt, The Animals and Children Took to the Streets (BAC)
 Jon Bausor, Lord of the Flies (Open Air Theatre)
 Giles Cadle, The Kitchen (National's Olivier)
 William Dudley, Snake in the Grass (Print Room)

Charles Wintour Award for Most Promising Playwright
  Penelope Skinner, The Village Bike (Royal Court)
 EV Crowe, 'Kin' (Royal Court)
 Vivienne Franzmann, Mogadishu (Lyric Hammersmith)

Longlisted
 Tom Basden, Joseph K (Gate)
 Jesse Briton, 'Bound' (Southwark Playhouse)
 Ella Hickson, Precious Little Talent (Trafalgar Studios)
 Morgan Lloyd Malcolm, Belongings (Hampstead & Trafalgar Studios)

Milton Shulman Award for Outstanding Newcomer
  Kyle Soller for his performances in The Glass Menagerie (Young Vic) & The Government Inspector (Young Vic) & The Faith Machine (Royal Court)
 Phoebe Fox for her performances in As You Like It (Rose Kingston) and The Acid Test (Royal Court) & There Is A War (National's Paintframe)
 Malachi Kirby for his performance in Mogadishu (Lyric, Hammersmith)
 David Wilson Barnes for his performance in Becky Shaw (Almeida)

Longlisted
 1927 (company) for their production of The Animals and Children Took to the Streets (BAC)
 Robyn Addison for her performances in The Rivals (Theatre Royal Bath/ Theatre Royal Haymarket) & Mongrel Island (Soho)
 Tom Byam Shaw for his performances in Les Parents Terribles (Donmar at Trafalgar Studios) and The Tempest (Theatre Royal Haymarket)
 Joseph Drake for his performance in Kingdom of Earth (Print Room)
 Johnny Flynn for his performance in The Heretic (Royal Court)
 Vanessa Kirby for her performance in The Acid Test (Royal Court)
 David Mercatali for his direction of Tender Napalm (Southwark Playhouse)
 Chris Rolls for his direction of Les Parents Terribles (Donmar at Trafalgar Studios)
 Thom Southerland for his direction of Parade (Southwark Playhouse)

Editor's Award
 Michael Grandage for making the Donmar Warehouse a star

Beyond Theatre Award
 Pet Shop Boys and Javier de Frutos for The Most Incredible Thing (Sadler's Wells)

Lebedev Special Award
 Kristin Scott Thomas for her contribution to theatre

Moscow Art Theatre's Golden Seagull
 Tom Stoppard for his contribution to Russian theatre and the international stage

Judges
 Sarah Sands, London Evening Standard
 Henry Hitchings, London Evening Standard
 Georgina Brown, Mail on Sunday
 Susannah Clapp, The Observer
 Charles Spencer, Daily Telegraph
 Libby Purves, The Times
 Matt Wolf, International Herald Tribune
 Evgeny Lebedev, chairman of the Evening Standard

References

Evening Standard Theatre Awards ceremonies
2011 theatre awards
2011 awards in the United Kingdom
November 2011 events in the United Kingdom